Lux Express (also known as LuxExpress, Lux Express Group/Grupp) is an Estonian transport company. The company uses two brands: Lux Express and Simple Express. The company operates bus routes in Baltic states, and also in St. Petersburg, Kaliningrad and Minsk.

The company was established in 1993 under the name MootorReisi AS.

In every year, about 500,000 passengers have been serviced by the company.

References

External links
 

Transport companies of Estonia
Bus operating companies of Europe